Gregory Dale Elmore (born September 4, 1946, in the Coronado Naval Air Station, California) is an American drummer, formerly with The Brogues and the San Francisco rock band Quicksilver Messenger Service.

Elmore also played regularly with Terry and the Pirates (Terry Dolan, John Cipollina, etc.) from 1981-1989. Oddly enough, he had shared the same birthdate and year (September 4, 1946) as Quicksilver bandmate and guitarist Gary Duncan, who died in 2019.

References 

1946 births
American rock drummers
Musicians from California
Living people
Quicksilver Messenger Service members
20th-century American drummers
American male drummers
20th-century American male musicians